The 1991–92 Omani League was the 18th edition of the top football league in Oman. Fanja SC were the defending champions, having won the previous 1990–91 Omani League season. Dhofar S.C.S.C. emerged as the champions of the 1991–92 Omani League with a total of 48 points.

Teams
This season the league had 12 teams.

Stadia and locations

League table

Season statistics

Top scorers

Top level Omani football league seasons
1991–92 in Omani football
Oman